The Source is the fourth studio album by Grandmaster Flash, released in 1986. It was reissued in the US on CD for the first time in 2005 (Collectors' Choice Music, CCM-583-2).

Track listing
"Street Scene" – 3:06
"Style (Peter Gunn Theme)" – 3:57
"Ms. Thang" – 3:55
"P.L.U. (Peace, Love and Unity)" – 3:57
"Throwin' Down" – 3:45
"Behind Closed Doors" – 3:39
"Larry's Dance Theme (Part 2)" – 3:31
"Lies" – 3:32
"Fastest Man Alive" – 5:22
"Freelance" – 5:08

Personnel
Grandmaster Flash (Joseph Saddler) – turntables
The Kidd Creole (Nathaniel Glover jr) – Lead and background vocals, writer and arranger
Rahiem (Guy Todd Williams) – Lead and background vocals, writer and arranger
La Von (Kevin Lavon Dukes) – Lead and background vocals, writer and arranger, bass guitar
Broadway (Russell Wheeler) – rap vocals
Larry "Love" (Larry Parker) – Dancer
Shame (Jesse Dukes) – Flash's assistant

Musicians
Chuck Kentis – synth
Guy Williams, Joseph Saddler – drum programming
Guy Vaughn – bass, synth, drum programming
Allen Douches – engineer
Barbara Baker, Vincent Castellano – executive producers
Joseph Saddler, Vincent Castellano – producer

Recorded and mixed at Grand Slam Studio, West Orange, NJ.

References

1986 albums
Grandmaster Flash albums
Elektra Records albums
Albums produced by Grandmaster Flash